Joan Joyce (August 18, 1940 – March 26, 2022) was the softball coach at Florida Atlantic, for 28 years until her death in 2022. She previously was a softball player for the Raybestos Brakettes and the Orange Lionettes. She also had set records on the LPGA Tour as a golfer and on the USA women's national basketball team, and was a player and coach for the Connecticut Clippers volleyball team.

Softball

Playing career
Joyce played for the Brakettes from 1954 to 1963, the Lionettes from 1964 to 1966, and again the Brakettes from 1967 to 1975, In her career, she racked up many of the sport's records, which have yet to be broken:

Most consecutive all-star team selections (18)
Eight-time MVP in the National Tournament (1961, 1963, 1968, 1971 (co-MVP), 1973, 1974, and 1975)
Most victories in a season (42) (in 1974)
Two no-hit, no-run games in National Tournament (four times)
Shutouts in a season (38 in 1974)
Most innings pitched in a game (29 in 1968 against Perkasie)
Career doubles (153)
Doubles in a season (22 in 1968)
Career triples (67)
Brakettes team batting champion (1960, 1962, 1967–69, 1973)
Highest batting average (.467 in 1971)

Her pitches were extremely fast at over 70 miles per hour. She pitched 150 no-hitters and 50 perfect games, with a lifetime earned run average of 0.09.  In her record-setting 42-win season, she pitched 38 shutouts. Her 1974 Brakettes team was the first American team to win the world championship.

In exhibition games, she struck out Ted Williams at Municipal Stadium in Waterbury, Connecticut in 1961 (also during a brief stint in 1966) and Hank Aaron in 1978.

Coaching career
Joyce was co-founder (with Billie Jean King, Jim Jorgensen and Dennis Murphy) of the Women's Professional Softball League in 1976 and the coach and part owner of the Connecticut Falcons team, which won the Championship all four years of the league's history.

She was a coach at Florida Atlantic University, having coached softball since 1994 and women's golf since 1996. As of 2022, Joyce's Owls team won eleven conference championships and advanced to eleven NCAA Division I softball tournaments. In her first two seasons (1995 and 1996), the Owls were Atlantic Sun Conference runners-up, then won the next eight championships. They took second in 2005, then won again in 2006. The Owls won the Sun Belt Conference championship in 2007, and the Conference USA championship in 2016. Joyce was named Atlantic Sun Conference Coach of the Year in 1995, 1997, 1999, 2000, and 2002, Sun Belt Conference Coach of the Year in 2007, and Conference USA Coach of the Year in 2016 and 2018.

On March 18, 2022, Joyce earned her 1,000th career win as a head coach, becoming the 27th NCAA Division I softball coach to reach the milestone.

Golf
After softball, she joined the LPGA Tour, in which she was from 1977 to 1994. Her best finishes included sixth-place in tournaments in 1981, 1982 and 1984, including a round of 66. Joyce holds the record for lowest number of putts (17) in a single LPGA round, set at the 1982 Lady Michelob.

Volleyball
Joyce served as player and coach in the United States Volleyball Association with the Connecticut Clippers. She competed in four national tournaments, and was named to the All-East Regional team.

Basketball
Joyce played on the USA women's national basketball team in 1964 and 1965, setting a national tournament single game scoring record in 1964 with 67 points. She was a four-time Women's Basketball Association All-American, and a three-time Amateur Athletic Union (AAU) All-America player.

Halls of Fame
Joyce was inducted into the National Softball Hall of Fame in 1983. She was inducted into the International Softball Federation Hall of Fame in 1999.

In addition to the National Softball Hall of Game and International Softball Federation Hall of Fame, she has been inducted into the Palm Beach County Sports Hall of Fame, Connecticut Women's Hall of Fame, the Connecticut Women's Basketball Hall of Fame, the Hank O'Donnell Hall of Fame, the Fairfield County Sports Hall of Fame, the Greater Waterbury Hall of Fame, and, as one of only three Americans, the International Women's Sports Hall of Fame.

Death
Joyce died on March 26, 2022 in Boca Raton, Florida.

Head coaching record

College softball

References

External links
 Florida Atlantic profile
 

American female golfers
American softball coaches
College golf coaches in the United States
Female sports coaches
Florida Atlantic Owls softball coaches
LPGA Tour golfers
People from Palm Beach County, Florida
Softball players from Connecticut
Sportspeople from Waterbury, Connecticut
1940 births
2022 deaths